Office Zone (now ABC Office) is a privately owned, United States-based office machine and equipment retailer and distributor.  Office Zone incorporated in 1996.  Office Zone supplies office equipment and furniture to corporations and small businesses in North America. In June of 2019 Office Zone joined with American Binding Company Inc. (DBA ABC Office) and now operates under that name.

External links
 
Company website

American companies established in 1996
Retail companies established in 1996
Office supply retailers of the United States
Privately held companies based in Utah